Vasula speciosa is a species of sea snail, a marine gastropod mollusk, in the family Muricidae, the murex snails or rock snails.

Description
The shell is white, with revolving bands composed of brown squares The shell is yellowish white within.

Distribution
This species occurs in the Pacific Ocean from Baja California to Peru.

References

 Claremont, M., Vermeij, G. J., Williams, S. T. & Reid, D. G. (2013). Global phylogeny and new classification of the Rapaninae (Gastropoda: Muricidae), dominant molluscan predators on tropical rocky seashores. Molecular Phylogenetics and Evolution. 66: 91–102.

External links
 Duclos (P. L.). (1832). Description de quelques espèces de pourpres, servant de type à six sections établies dans ce genre. Annales des Sciences Naturelles. 26: 103-112
 Küster, H. C. (1843-1860). Die Gattungen Buccinum, Purpura, Concholepas und Monoceros. In: Küster, H. C., Ed. Systematisches Conchylien-Cabinet von Martini und Chemnitz. Neu herausgegeben und vervollständigt. Dritten Bandes erste Abtheilung. 3(1): 1-229, pls 1-35. Nürnberg: Bauer & Raspe
 Blainville, H. M. D. de. (1832). Disposition méthodique des espèces récentes et fossiles des genres Pourpre, Ricinule, Licorne et Concholépas de M. de Lamarck, et description des espèces nouvelles ou peu connues, faisant partie de la collection du Muséum d'Histoire Naturelle de Paris. Nouvelles Annales du Muséum d'Histoire Naturelle. 1: 189-263, pls 9-12

speciosa
Gastropods described in 1832